Max Amini(born in 1981 in Tucson, Arizona) is an Iranian-American comedian, actor, producer, and director. Max is known primarily as a world touring stand-up comedian, and has appeared on shows such as NBC's Heroes, Netflix's Real Rob with Rob Schneider, and Comedy Central's Mind of Mencia. On an episode of Spike's Car Radio Podcast, Jerry Seinfeld named Max Amini one of the top comedians to watch. Max established his production company, Abstraction Media in 2010, and has sold projects to networks such as Voice Of America, Discovery, and more. Other projects include directing a Netflix original stand-up special, Enissa Amani: Erhenwort, and the feature film, James The Second, set to release in 2022.

Early life and education
Max Amini was born in Tucson, Arizona, to Iranian parents who immigrated after the 1979 revolution. He went to a high school in Washington, D.C. and then moved to California and graduated from the school of Theater, Film and Television at UCLA in 2004. Amini's father is an ethnic Persian from Isfahan and his mother is an Iranian Azerbaijani from Tabriz.

Stand-up comedy 
Amini began his stand-up comedy career in 2002 at the LA Improv, he developed a stand-up comedy tour named "Exotic Imports" and has since performed worldwide.  Amini has multiple hour comedy specials and continues to tour, and perform regularly at the Hollywood Laugh Factory.

Acting 
Amini is an actor with film and TV credits including NBC's Heroes, Netflix's Real Rob with Rob Schneider, Comedy Central's Mind of Mencia, and his leading role in the movie How Beer Pong Saved my Life, released in 2010.

References

External links 
 
 

21st-century American comedians
American stand-up comedians
American comedians of Iranian descent
American people of Iranian-Azerbaijani descent
American male television actors
American male film actors
UCLA Film School alumni
Male actors from Tucson, Arizona
1981 births
Living people